Area code 865 serves Knoxville, Tennessee, and the nine surrounding counties (Anderson, Blount, Grainger, Jefferson, Knox, Loudon, Roane, Sevier, and Union) in central East Tennessee. The area incorporates most of the region defined as the Knoxville-Sevierville-La Follette Combined Statistical Area.

Cities in the 865 area include Knoxville, Alcoa, Bean Station, Clinton, Gatlinburg, Harriman, Jefferson City, Kingston, Lenoir City, Maryville, Maynardville, Norris, Oak Ridge, Pigeon Forge, Plainview, Rockwood, Rutledge, Sevierville and Townsend.

History
When planning of the area code system concluded in 1947, area code 901 was assigned as the sole area code for Tennessee.  In 1954, the numbering plan area was restricted to West Tennessee, while everything east of the Tennessee River received the new area code 615.

This division remained in place for 41 years, until area code 423 was created as the area code for most of East Tennessee, with 615 restricted to Middle Tennessee.  The state's three area codes were now roughly coextensive with the Grand Divisions of Tennessee.

This was intended as a long-term solution. However, within only three years, 423 was already on the brink of exhaustion due to the proliferation of cell phones and pagers. With the prospect of 423 being exhausted by 1999, it soon became apparent that East Tennessee needed another area code, even though this would have forced some residents to change their numbers for the second time in a decade.

The Tennessee Regulatory Authority requested that the code 865 be assigned to Knoxville when the area was split from 423.  This was because on a standard telephone keypad, the numbers 865 correspond to the letters VOL, the commonly used short version of Volunteers, which is the formal nickname of the sports teams at the University of Tennessee. Normally, when an area code is split, the largest city in an existing numbering plan area keeps the original code—in this case, Knoxville.

When plans were drawn up for the split, it was decided that the Tri-Cities were not large enough for their own area code, but were too large to follow Knoxville into 865. This left the Tennessee Regulatory Authority with two options–turn 865 into an overlay for all of East Tennessee, or make two non-contiguous sections of 423. Overlays were a new concept at the time, and met with some resistance due to the need for ten-digit dialing. The Regulatory Authority chose the second option.

865 began its split on October 1, 1999; permissive dialing of 423 continued throughout East Tennessee until February 1, 2000.  This resulted in 423 becoming one of the few non-contiguous area codes in the country; 865 is now almost entirely surrounded by the two sections of 423.

On October 24, 2021, area code 865 was transitioned to ten-digit dialing, despite not being part of an overlay numbering plan, in which multiple area codes are assigned to a numbering plan area. The area code had telephone numbers assigned for the central office code 988. In 2020, 988 was designated nationwide as a dialing code for the National Suicide Prevention Lifeline, which created a conflict for exchanges that still permitted seven-digit dialing.

References

External links

List of exchanges from AreaCodeDownload.com, 865 Area Code

865
865
Knoxville metropolitan area